Michael Jessen (born 4 April 1960 in Frederiksberg) is a Danish rower.

References 
 
 

1960 births
Living people
Danish male rowers
Sportspeople from Frederiksberg
Rowers at the 1980 Summer Olympics
Rowers at the 1984 Summer Olympics
Olympic bronze medalists for Denmark
Olympic medalists in rowing
Medalists at the 1984 Summer Olympics
Olympic rowers of Denmark